is a Japanese manga series by Sō Hamayumiba. It was serialized in Houbunsha's seinen manga magazine Manga Time Kirara Forward from April 2011 to February 2018, with its chapters collected in ten tankōbon volumes. An anime television series adaptation by Madhouse aired in Japan from July to September 2014.

Plot
Naru Sekiya is an ordinary 14-year-old middle school girl who likes fairy tales, but is worried about her lack of other interests. She has a chance encounter with a "fairy", a foreign girl practicing dance at night. On a spur of the moment, Naru asks to join her and is introduced to the world of yosakoi dancing. The series' title is a portmanteau (combination) of the first two letters of the girls' first names: Hana, Naru, Yaya, Machi, and Tami.

Characters

Main characters

A 14-year-old girl who considers herself extremely average. Aside from reading fairy tales, she doesn't have many interests outside of practising iaido at home. She lacks confidence to bring herself out of her routine life, but upon encountering Hana and taking up yosakoi, she starts to change little by little. Her favorite flower is the cherry blossom.

An excitable American girl who transfers into Naru's class. Having become fascinated with yosakoi following a trip to Japan when she was young, she decided to move there and form her own yosakoi club, inviting Naru to join her. She lives with her father, who is divorced from her mother who lives in America. She has a tomboyish personality and tends to get a little over excited, sometimes dancing in dangerous locations. Her favorite flower is the bluestar.

Naru's best friend whose parents run a noodle shop. She possesses both brains and beauty, making her very popular at her school, but has messy handwriting. She is particularly clingy towards Naru and gets jealous when she becomes friendly with others. She is initially hesitant towards yosakoi and joins the club in name only, but after her dream of being part of a band falls apart, she understands she has a place to belong and joins the club in earnest. Her favorite flower is the rose.

The student council vice-president at Naru's school. As both of their fathers were acquaintances, she and Naru grew up together, with Naru regarding her as a big sister. She is quite fond of her father, often being accused of having an Electra complex, and had spent most of her time focusing on becoming a proper Japanese woman in order to please him. However, Naru soon helps her to overcome her worries and she joins the yosakoi club. Her favorite flower is the lily.

The student council president and Tami's close friend, who is the younger sister of Sally. Whilst generally strict, she is particularly weak to sweet things, as well as Tami's general requests. She is initially hostile towards Sally for leaving home, but she soon comes to understand her true feelings and joins the yosakoi club. Her favorite flower is the sunflower.

Yosakoi Club

Sally Tokiwa is Naru, Yaya, and Hana's homeroom and English teacher and Machi's older sister; she is nicknamed 'Sally-sensei'. She originally planned to take over her parents' hospital together with Machi, but after helping Machi with studying, Sally chose to leave home, inspired to become a teacher instead. She becomes the yosakoi's club advisor, initially showing little interest but soon becoming more involved, including trying to make the girls wear cosplay while performing, though she is occasionally shown to be lazy and forgetful.

Need Cool Quality band
An anime original band, the Need Cool Quality was the band joined by Yaya, the drummer of the band, Sachiko, Arisa and Yuka before its disbandment due to personal issues of Sachiko, Arisa and Yuka and the failure of the band in a light music band audition. 

Lead vocalist and the guitarist of the band.

Co-vocalist and the guitarist of the band.

Bass player of the band.

Supporting characters

A 33-year-old bachelor who runs the Yosakoi Masaru shop. Despite having an appearance like that of a bald yakuza, he is quite friendly and eager to help those learning yosakoi. He is affectionately called  by Hana.

Hana's mother.

Naru's father.

Tami's housemaid.

Media

Manga
Hanayamata, written and illustrated by Sō Hamayumiba, was serialized in Houbunsha's Manga Time Kirara Forward magazine from April 23, 2011 to February 24, 2018. It was collected into ten tankōbon volumes from December 12, 2011 to April 12, 2018.

Anime
An anime television series adaptation produced by Madhouse aired in Japan from July 8 to September 23, 2014 and was simulcast by Crunchyroll. (composed of vocalist Yuka Ōtsubo and musician Yuuyu). The same ending theme is also performed by Team "Hanayamata" in episode 12. Furthermore, an insert song,  by Need Cool Quality (Kaya Okuno, Yuki Wakai, Ayano Yamamoto and Maika Takai) is used in the first episode.

In September 2015, Sentai Filmworks announced they had acquired the license of the series in North America. Later that month, it was revealed that the DVD and Blu-ray of Hanayamata would be released on January 19, 2016, as well as getting an official English dub. The series has also been licensed in both the United Kingdom and the Republic of Ireland by Animatsu Entertainment and in Australasia by Madman Entertainment.

Episode list

Video games
An adventure/rhythm game based on the series, titled , was developed by Bandai Namco Games and released for the PlayStation Vita on November 13, 2014. The game was also available in a limited edition containing a bonus Blu-ray Disc and an original drama CD. Characters from the series appear alongside other Manga Time Kirara characters in the 2018 mobile RPG, Kirara Fantasia.

See also
Dropout Idol Fruit Tart – Another manga series by the same author

Notes

References

External links
 

Anime series based on manga
Comedy anime and manga
Dance in anime and manga
Houbunsha manga
Madhouse (company)
PlayStation Vita games
Seinen manga
Sentai Filmworks
Slice of life anime and manga
TV Tokyo original programming